Glee: The Music, The Rocky Horror Glee Show is the third extended play (EP) by the cast of the musical television series Glee, released on October 19, 2010. It contains seven songs and accompanies the episode "The Rocky Horror Glee Show", originally aired October 26, 2010 on Fox. The Halloween episode sees the glee club recreating the 1973 comedy horror musical The Rocky Horror Show, written and composed by Richard O'Brien. Dante Di Loreto and Brad Falchuk serve as the executive producers.

Background and development
The Glee episode "The Rocky Horror Glee Show" originally aired October 26, 2010 as part of Fox's series of Halloween-themed episodes, and features a staging of The Rocky Horror Show by the school's glee club. Plans for the episode were revealed at the 2010 San Diego Comic-Con International by Glee creator Ryan Murphy after cast member Chris Colfer expressed desire to cover "Time Warp" on the show. Jayma Mays, who plays the role of guidance counselor Emma Pillsbury, auditioned with "Touch-a, Touch-a, Touch-a, Touch Me" and performs the song, with some changes in lyrics. "I'm so going to have to get her to do that on the show," said Murphy on her audition piece. "Whatever Happened to Saturday Night" is sung by John Stamos, and "Damn It, Janet" by Cory Monteith and Lea Michele.

The EP's track list was announced in an official press release on September 28, 2010. It was released digitally and physically on October 19, 2010 in North America.

Reception

Andrew Leahey of allmusic gave a rating of three-and-a-half stars out of five, calling the EP "one of the better recordings in Glees catalog" and "a tidy, polished, well-sung tribute album." He praised the performances of Naya Rivera, Jayma Mays, and John Stamos, vocalists infrequently heard on the series, but felt the casting of Amber Riley as Dr. Frank-N-Furter was misplaced.

Glee: The Music, The Rocky Horror Glee Show debuted at number six on the Billboard 200 the week of October 27, 2010, with 48,000 copies sold, the lowest debut and sales for the cast in the United States. This debut made Glee the first television series to have six or more soundtracks chart in the chart's top ten, and marked the highest position ever reached for a Rocky Horror album. As of April 2011, the EP is Glee lowest-selling in the US, with 160,000 copies.

Track listing

Credits and personnel

Persons credited for the project are as follows.

Adam Anders – arranger; engineer; producer; soundtrack producer; vocals
Alex Anders – engineer
Nikki Anders – vocals
Peer Åström – arranger; engineer; mixing; producer
Dave Bett – art direction
Per Björling – arranger
PJ Bloom – music supervisor
Geoff Bywater – executive in charge of music
Deyder Cintron – assistant engineer
Kamari Copeland – vocals
Tim Davis – vocal arrangement; vocal contractor; vocals
Dante Di Loreto – soundtrack executive producer
Brad Falchuk – soundtrack executive producer
Heather Guibert – coordination
Missi Hale – vocals

Tobias Kampe-Flygare - vocals
Storm Lee – vocals
David Loucks – vocals
Meaghan Lyons – coordination
Dominick Maita – mastering
Maria Paula Marulanda – art direction
Ryan Murphy – producer; soundtrack producer
Richard O'Brien – composer
Martin Persson – arranger; orchestration; programming
Stefan Persson – string arrangements
Patrick Randak – photography
Federico Ruiz – design
Jenny Sinclair – coordination
Windy Wagner – vocals

Charts

Weekly charts

Year-end charts

Release history

References

External links
Glee: The Music, The Rocky Horror Glee Show at GleeTheMusic.com

Glee (TV series) albums
2010 EPs
2010 soundtrack albums
Columbia Records EPs
Covers EPs
Rocky Horror
Television soundtracks